Paromoeocerus stictonotus is a species of beetle in the family Cerambycidae. It was described by Napp in 1976.

References

Unxiini
Beetles described in 1976